Densill Theobald CM (born 27 June 1982) is a Trinidadian former professional footballer who played as a central midfielder and represented Trinidad and Tobago national team 99 times, scoring twice.

Club career

Early career and moves to Europe
Theobald joined Scottish club Falkirk in the summer transfer window of 2005, after the recommendation of international team-mate Russell Latapy. Although he played regularly at international level, he never played a first team game for Falkirk and so he left the club and returned to Caledonia AIA, in the summer of 2007 he returned to Europe, and joined Hungarian team Újpest FC.

Theobald joined the Seattle Sounders for a trial in February 2009, but did not make the club's roster.

Dempo
On 16 January 2012, it was officially announced that after terms were agreed with Újpest and Caledonia AIA that Theobald has signed for Dempo SC in the I-League in India.

Royal Wahingdoh
In December 2014, Theobald signed for newly promoted I-League club Royal Wahingdoh form Shillong for one season. He appeared in all games for Wahingdoh, and the team ended their debut season in third position with 30 points after 20 league matches.

Sporting De Goa
In December 2015, Theobald signed for Sporting de Goa.

Mumbai FC
In January 2017, he signed with another I-League club Mumbai FC.

International career
Theobald was a regular member of the Trinidad and Tobago national football team and played in all three of the country's World Cup games at the 2006 FIFA World Cup.

Following the retirements of Dwight Yorke and Dennis Lawrence from international football, Theobald has since been named captain of the 'Soca Warriors'.

He appeared in several editions of Caribbean Cup and he was in the squad of Trinidad's silver medal winning team at the 2012 Caribbean Cup, where they lost in the final to Cuba.

Personal life
As a member of the squad that competed at the 2006 FIFA World Cup in Germany, Theobald was awarded the Chaconia Medal (Gold Class), the second highest state decoration of Trinidad and Tobago.

Honours
Morvant Caledonia United
TT Pro League: 2017, runner-up 2012–13

Central
TT League Cup: 2018
TT Pro League: runner-up 2018
Charity Shield: runner-up 2018

W Connection
CFU Club Championship: 2012

Royal Wahingdoh
I-League: third place 2014–15

Trinidad & Tobago
Caribbean Cup: runner-up 2012

Individual
 Chaconia Medal Gold Class, 2006

References

External links
Densill Theobald at www.infogol.net

1982 births
Living people
Trinidad and Tobago footballers
Trinidad and Tobago international footballers
Trinidad and Tobago expatriate footballers
Trinidad and Tobago expatriate sportspeople in Canada
Trinidad and Tobago expatriate sportspeople in India
Falkirk F.C. players
Újpest FC players
Canadian Soccer League (1998–present) players
TT Pro League players
Morvant Caledonia United players
Toronto (Mississauga) Olympians players
Joe Public F.C. players
Expatriate footballers in Hungary
2005 CONCACAF Gold Cup players
2006 FIFA World Cup players
2007 CONCACAF Gold Cup players
2013 CONCACAF Gold Cup players
Dempo SC players
I-League players
Expatriate soccer players in Canada
Expatriate footballers in India
Recipients of the Chaconia Medal
Association football midfielders